Tomb KV30 is located in the Valley of the Kings in Egypt. It was discovered by Giovanni Belzoni in 1817, working on a commission from the  Second Earl Belmore. As a consequence, it is also known as "Lord Belmore's tomb".

Nothing is known about the tomb's original occupant or occupants.

References
Reeves, N & Wilkinson, R.H. The Complete Valley of the Kings, 1996, Thames and Hudson, London.
Siliotti, A. Guide to the Valley of the Kings and to the Theban Necropolises and Temples, 1996, A.A. Gaddis, Cairo.

External links
Theban Mapping Project: KV30 includes detailed maps of most of the tombs.

1817 archaeological discoveries
Valley of the Kings